Operazione White Crane (Operation White Crane) was Italy's military relief operation for Haiti, following the 12 January 2010 earthquake.

Force composition

Italy is sending:
 aircraft carrier 
 Cavours complement:
 6 Navy helicopters
 4 SH-3D helicopters
 2 EH-101 helicopters
 two operating theatres
 550 ship's crew, medical complement, force protection sailors
 Shipped on Cavour: (Task Force Genio)
 15 Army tracked vehicles
 20 Army wheeled vehicles
 5 mobile medical vehicles
 Army personnel
 200 alpine troops of the 2° reggimento Genio di Trento
 Air Force personnel
 Carabinieri military police 13° RGT. "F.G.V."
 Carabinieri medical unit
 mobile hospital
 200 tonnes of food
 Field hospital
 C-130

Mission timeline
On 14 January 2010, Italy dispatched a C-130 loaded with 20 surgeons, some soldiers, some civil protection officers, and a field hospital. It decided to send a warship.

On 19 January 2010, Cavour set sail for Haiti, leaving La Spezia.

As of 29 January 2010, Cavour had picked up a Brazilian relief force at Fortaleza. The Brazilians added two helicopters, a UH-14 Super Puma and a UH-12 Squirrel (AS350), 11 civilians (6 doctors, 5 nurses), 63 military (25 health professionals).

On 1 February 2010, Cavour arrived at the Dominican Republic port of Puerto Caucedo, near the capital of Santo Domingo. The land element, Task Force Genio, disembarked, and would trek overland to Haiti, due to the damaged docks at Port-au-Prince. Cavour has RO-RO capability. It would depart for Haiti later.

On 3 February 2010, Cavour had disgorged all the land-mobile land-element. The overland trip to Port-au-Prince from Puerto Caucedo took 36 hours.

On 6 February 2010, Cavour arrived at Port-au-Prince.

As of 7 February 2010, over 25 aid flights using the Italian and Brazilian helicopters over the two days that Cavour had been at Port-au-Prince, had been completed.

Cavour had remain docked at Port-au-Prince through mid-April.

Reactions
Several Italians have criticized the use of Cavour since it costs over 200,000 Euros a day to operate, and shipping by air would have been far faster. Others have said, that it is a drop in the bucket compared to the efforts by the US. Some have pointed out, it is one of the largest efforts out of Europe.

Notes

References

2010 Haiti earthquake relief
Foreign relations of Italy
White Crane